The 1925 Giro d'Italia was the 13th edition of the Giro d'Italia, a Grand Tour organized and sponsored by the newspaper La Gazzetta dello Sport. The race was won by the Alfredo Binda of the Legnano team. Second and third respectively were the Italian riders Costante Girardengo and Giovanni Brunero.

Participants
Of the 126 riders that began the Giro d'Italia on 16 May, 39 of them made it to the finish in Milan on 7 June. Riders were allowed to ride on their own or as a member of a team. There were six teams that competed in the race: Aliprandi-Pirelli, Jenis, Legnano-Pirelli, Olympia-Pirelli, Peugeot-Pirelli, and Wolsit-Pirelli.

The peloton was completely composed of Italians, a trend which continued until the 1950s because of Italy's fascist policies and political climate. The field featured two former Giro d'Italia champions in the 1919 Giro d'Italia winner Costante Girardengo and returning champion Giovanni Brunero. Other notable Italian riders that started the race included Gaetano Belloni, Giovanni Rossignoli, and Pietro Bestetti. This was the first Giro d'Italia that Alfredo Binda competed in.

Final standings

Stage results

General classification

There were 39 cyclists who had completed all twelve stages. For these cyclists, the times they had needed in each stage was added up for the general classification. The cyclist with the least accumulated time was the winner. Riccardo Gagliardi won the prize for best ranked independent rider in the general classification.

Notes

References

1925
Giro d'Italia
Giro d'Italia
Giro d'Italia
Giro d'Italia